The Bangladesh Jatiya Sramik League ( "Bangladesh National Worker's League") is a national trade union federation in Bangladesh.

 Nationally, it is affiliated with the National Coordination Committee for Workers' Education and internationally with the International Trade Union Confederation. K.M. Azam Khasru is general secretary of the union and Fazlul Haque Montu was its president until his death in 2020.

History 
The Bangladesh Jatiya Sramik League was founded in 1969 by Sheikh Mujibur Rahman, It is politically tied to the Awami League. The union was absolved in 1975 with BAKSAL due to an amendment to the constitution of Bangladesh. BJSL also had an armed wing Lal Bahini during 1972–1975.

References

National trade union centres of Bangladesh
International Trade Union Confederation
Trade unions established in 1969
Bangladesh Awami League
Labour relations in Bangladesh